The 2018 season was the Los Angeles Rams' 81st in the National Football League (NFL), their 82nd overall, their 52nd in the Greater Los Angeles Area and their second under head coach Sean McVay.

The Rams were the NFC Champions, finishing with a record of 13–3, improving on their 11–5 record from the 2017 season.  The team won its first eight games of the season (its best start since 1969) before losing to the Saints in Week 9.  After defeating the Kansas City Chiefs 54–51 in Week 11, the third highest-scoring game in NFL history, and a 30–16 victory over the Detroit Lions in Week 13, the Rams clinched the NFC West for the second consecutive year, giving Los Angeles its first back-to-back division titles since 1978 and 1979 and consecutive playoff berths for the first time since the 2003 and 2004, when the franchise was based in St. Louis. The Rams ended the regular season tied with New Orleans for the NFL's best record at 13–3. The 13 regular season wins was tied for the second-most in franchise history (along with the 1999 season, only trailing the Rams' 14-win campaign in 2001) and is the most wins in a season for a Los Angeles-based professional football team (as the Rams played in St. Louis in 1999 and 2001).

The Rams started their playoff run by defeating the Dallas Cowboys 30–22 in the Divisional Round to advance to the NFC Championship Game.  This would be their first NFC Championship Game appearance since 2001 as the St. Louis Rams, and their first as the Los Angeles Rams since 1989. The Rams then controversially defeated the number 1 seed New Orleans Saints in the NFC Championship Game 26–23 in overtime.  By defeating the Saints, the Rams advanced to Super Bowl LIII, where they faced the New England Patriots. The two teams previously met in Super Bowl XXXVI, in which the Patriots defeated the then-St. Louis Rams 20–17, winning their first Super Bowl title and kicking off their dynasty. This was the Rams' first Super Bowl appearance since that game and first as the Los Angeles Rams since Super Bowl XIV in 1979.  In a defensive battle, the Rams lost to the Patriots 13–3. However, they would return to the Super Bowl three years later and win Super Bowl LVI over the Cincinnati Bengals.

Offseason

Coaching changes
 The Oakland Raiders hired Rams quarterbacks coach Greg Olson as their new offensive coordinator on January 9, 2018.
 Offensive coordinator Matt LaFleur left the Rams to take the same position with the Tennessee Titans on January 30, 2018.

Uniform changes
The Rams announced during training camp that they would wear their all-white uniforms for the preseason and through the Rams' first two home games of the regular season. Beginning with a Thursday Night game against Minnesota on September 27, the Rams would wear their classic blue-and-yellow throwback uniforms as their primary home uniforms for the remainder of the season and throughout the playoffs (including Super Bowl LIII). Additionally, the team would wear their all-yellow color rush uniforms for scheduled prime time games against San Francisco and Kansas City later in the season.

Roster changes

Free agents

Unrestricted

Free agent signings

Trades

Acquired

Traded away

Releases

Draft

Draft trades
 The Rams traded their first round selection (No. 23) and sixth round selection (No. 198) to the New England Patriots in exchange for WR Brandin Cooks and the Patriots' fourth round selection (No. 136)
 The Rams traded their second-round selection (56th overall) and cornerback E. J. Gaines to Buffalo in exchange for Buffalo's sixth-round selection (195th overall) and wide receiver Sammy Watkins.
 The Rams traded their third-round selection (87th overall) to Oakland in exchange for Oakland's third- and seventh-round selections (89th and 217th overall).
 The Rams traded their fourth-round selection (124th overall) and second-round selection in 2019 to Kansas City in exchange for Kansas City's sixth-round selection (209th overall) and cornerback Marcus Peters.
 The Rams traded their seventh-round selection in 2019 and linebacker Alec Ogletree to the New York Giants in exchange for the Giants' fourth- and sixth-round selections (135th and 176th overall).
 The Rams traded their fourth round selection acquired from New England (136th overall) to the Carolina Panthers for the Panthers' fifth- and sixth-round selections (147th and 197th).
 The Rams traded their fifth-round selection (160th overall) to Denver in exchange for cornerback Aqib Talib.
 The Rams traded defensive end Robert Quinn and sixth-round selection (209th overall) to the Miami Dolphins in exchange for the Dolphins' fourth- and sixth-round selections (111th and 183rd overall).
 The Rams traded their two sixth-round selections (183rd and 217th overall) to Denver in exchange for Denver's fifth-round selection (160th overall).
 The Rams traded their sixth-round selection (194th overall) to Atlanta in exchange for Atlanta's two seventh-round selections (244th and 256th overall).
 The Rams traded Tavon Austin to the Dallas Cowboys for their sixth-round selection (192nd overall).
 The Rams traded offensive tackle Greg Robinson to Detroit in exchange for Detroit's sixth-round selection (194th overall).
 The Rams traded their seventh-round selection (241st overall) to Washington in exchange for tight end Derek Carrier.

Staff

Final roster

Preseason

Head coach Sean McVay drew considerable attention when he opted to keep his entire starting offense and most of his starting defense off the field for the entire preseason. Other than a few defensive series against Houston, no starters saw any action during the exhibition schedule.

Regular season

Schedule

Notes:
 Intra-division opponents are in bold text.
 The Week 11 game against the Kansas City Chiefs was originally scheduled to be played in Mexico City in Estadio Azteca as a part of the league's International Series, but was moved to Los Angeles due to concerns over the playing surface.

Game summaries

Week 1: at Oakland Raiders

The final game of Week 1 featured a highly anticipated showdown between head coaches Sean McVay and Jon Gruden, who had given McVay his first job as an NFL coach when both were at Tampa Bay. In front of a sellout crowd in Oakland that enthusiastically greeted Gruden in his return to coaching after a 10-year absence, the Raiders took an early lead on a touchdown run by running back Marshawn Lynch. The Rams responded as Todd Gurley took a short pass from Jared Goff and ran 19 yards for a touchdown. Los Angeles finally took the lead at the end of the third quarter as Goff connected with wide receiver Cooper Kupp for an 8-yard scoring pass. Kicker Greg Zuerlein was named NFC Special Teams Player of the Week after converting four field goals and three PATs. Defensively, the Rams kept Oakland out of the end zone after that opening-drive touchdown, led by linebacker Cory Littleton (11 tackles) and safety John Johnson, who both had interceptions to kill Raider scoring drives. Making his debut as a Ram, cornerback Marcus Peters picked off a Derek Carr pass and returned it 50 yards for a touchdown with just over two minutes remaining for the game's final score.

Week 2: vs. Arizona Cardinals

Opening a three-game home stand at the Los Angeles Memorial Coliseum, the Rams crushed the visiting Cardinals, who were limited to just 137 total offensive yards and did not pass the 50-yard line until the game's final minute. Former Rams quarterback Sam Bradford had a rough day against the team that drafted him No. 1 overall in 2010, throwing for only 90 yards and an interception by Rams cornerback Sam Shields. Strong safety John Johnson led the Rams with seven tackles, while linebacker Samson Ebukam added a sack. Offensively for Los Angeles, quarterback Jared Goff passed for 354 yards and a touchdown to tight end Tyler Higbee. Running back Todd Gurley totaled only 42 yards on the ground, but equaled his career high with three rushing touchdowns while rushing for a pair of two-point conversions after each of his first two scores. Goff passed to Malcolm Brown for two points after Gurley's third touchdown. The Rams opted for the two-point attempts after kicker Greg Zuerlein pulled a groin muscle during pregame warmups. Punter Johnny Hekker, normally the holder for placekicks, stepped in and converted a 20-yard field goal in the second quarter, and then a PAT attempt after the Rams' final touchdown (Cooper Kupp held on both attempts). With the win, the Rams improved to 2-0, the first time the team started the season with two straight wins since 2001.

Week 3: vs. Los Angeles Chargers

Hosting the Chargers in Los Angeles for the first time since 1991 (not counting preseason), the Rams would never trail as Todd Gurley rushed for 105 yards and scored the game's first touchdown. Jared Goff and Robert Woods connected for a touchdown at the end of the first quarter. Cory Littleton blocked a punt which was recovered in the end zone for a touchdown by Blake Countess in the second quarter as the Rams led 21-13. Countess was later named NFC Special Teams Player of the Week. During the third quarter, Goff (354 passing yards) threw two more touchdowns, one to Cooper Kupp and a second one to Woods, who finished with 10 receptions for 104 yards. The Rams offense was efficient, totaling 33 first downs to just 16 for the Chargers. Ndamukong Suh had a sack and a fumble recovery, while Littleton led the Rams with 10 tackles.

Week 4: vs. Minnesota Vikings

Jared Goff was named NFC Offensive Player of the Week after passing for a career-high 465 yards (the third-highest single-game total in team history) and five touchdowns to four different receivers. Todd Gurley (21 touches, 156 total offensive yards) caught the first TD pass in the first quarter, while Cooper Kupp scored twice and Brandin Cooks scored once in the second quarter on the way to a 28-20 Rams lead. Sam Ficken kicked a 34-yard field goal and Robert Woods caught the Rams' final score on a 31-yard pass late in the third period. Woods (five receptions, 101 yards, 1 TD), Cooks (seven receptions, 116 yards, 1 TD), and Kupp (nine receptions, 162 yards, 2 TDs) were the first wide receiver trio in team history to each go over 100 yards and score a touchdown in the same game. Defensively, Aaron Donald recorded his first two sacks of the season, and John Johnson had a team-high 11 tackles. This game also made history as the first-ever NFL broadcast to use an all-female announcing team, with Hannah Storm and Andrea Kremer providing play-by-play and commentary respectively via Amazon Prime streaming service.

Week 5: at Seattle Seahawks

It was a tight battle throughout at CenturyLink Field between the NFC West rivals. Todd Gurley scored three touchdowns on the ground, and Jared Goff threw for 321 yards and a touchdown pass to Cooper Kupp. New kicker Cairo Santos converted two field goals, the second one coming from 39 yards out to put the Rams into the lead with 6:05 remaining in the game. Seahawks quarterback Russell Wilson threw for three touchdowns, but was sacked twice and held without a rushing attempt for the first time in his career. The outcome wasn't decided until the final minute when Goff converted a 4th-and-1 play at L.A.'s 42-yard-line with 1:39 remaining. The successful 2-yard quarterback sneak allowed the Rams to run out the clock.

Week 6: at Denver Broncos

Running back Todd Gurley turned in a career-best performance, rushing for 208 yards on 28 carries and scoring two touchdowns as the Rams built a 20-3 lead and then held on against the host Broncos. For his effort, Gurley was named NFC Offensive Player of the Week. Robert Woods caught 10 passes for 109 yards and Jared Goff passed for 201 yards but was held without a touchdown for the first time during the season. Cairo Santos kicked three field goals for the Rams, and free safety Lamarcus Joyner led the Rams on defense with seven tackles. With the win, the Rams improved to 6-0 (matching their best start since 2001) and, following the Chiefs' loss to the Patriots later that evening, ended the day as the NFL's lone remaining unbeaten team. Despite the win, the Rams had by far their lowest score to this point, only putting up 23 points while the lowest they had scored before was 33. Also, this game was played on Jared Goff's 24th birthday.

Week 7: at San Francisco 49ers

The Rams improved to 7-0, the best start since 1985, in scoring their largest margin of victory at San Francisco in 60 years (a 33-3 Rams victory at Kezar Stadium in 1958). Defensive tackle Aaron Donald had the finest day of his professional career with nine tackles (eight solo), six tackles for loss (including four sacks), plus a forced fumble and fumble recovery and was named NFC Defensive Player of the Week. Linebacker Cory Littleton added two sacks to go with his team-leading 10 total tackles, while John Johnson and Troy Hill both came up with interceptions. Rams quarterback Jared Goff had an efficient day, completing 18 of 24 passes for 202 yards with touchdown passes to Brandin Cooks and Todd Gurley, who also added two rushing touchdowns to add to his league-leading 14 total touchdowns on the season.

Week 8: vs. Green Bay Packers

The Rams fell behind early, but battled back from a 10-0 deficit to defeat the visiting Packers. Late in the second quarter, a 52-yard punt by Johnny Hekker was downed at the Green Bay 1 by Sam Shields. One play later, linebacker Mark Barron stuffed Packers running back Aaron Jones for a safety with 2:54 remaining in the half. Receiving the free kick, the Rams drove 72 yards in seven plays when Jared Goff connected with Josh Reynolds for a 1-yard touchdown pass to cut the Packers lead to 10-8. In the third quarter, Goff threw touchdown passes to Todd Gurley and to Reynolds again for a 23-13 lead. Green Bay reclaimed the lead with two touchdowns sandwiched around a Greg Zuerlein field goal to lead 27-26 in the fourth quarter. Zuerlein put the Rams back on top with a 34-yard field goal just before the two-minute warning. On the ensuing kickoff, the Packers' Ty Montgomery ran the return out of the end zone when he collided with Rams defender Ramik Wilson, who stripped the ball and recovered the fumble. The Rams then ran out the clock, as Gurley (114 yards, 14 carries) went down voluntarily after picking up L.A.'s last first down to preserve the victory. With the win, the Rams improved to 8-0 for the first time since 1969.

Week 9: at New Orleans Saints

The Rams fell behind 35-14 late in the second quarter, but rallied to tie the game behind the passing of Jared Goff (28 of 40, 391 yards, three TDs), but ultimately could not overcome the host Saints and suffered their first loss of the season. New Orleans quarterback Drew Brees passed for 346 yards and four touchdowns, including a 72-yard scoring strike to Michael Thomas late in the fourth quarter that put the game out of reach. Defensively, John Johnson and Cory Littleton had nine tackles each for the Rams. Brandin Cooks had six receptions for 114 yards and a touchdown, and with his 8-yard touchdown run in the first quarter, Todd Gurley set a new Rams team record by scoring a touchdown in 12 straight games, breaking the mark he shared with Elroy "Crazy Legs" Hirsch.

After losing this game, they meet again in the NFC Championship.

Week 10: vs. Seattle Seahawks

The Rams clinched back-to-back winning seasons for the first time since 2001 with a comeback victory over the Seahawks just four days after a shooting in Thousand Oaks near their training facility. Quarterback Jared Goff threw for 318 yards and touchdown passes to tight ends Gerald Everett and Tyler Higbee, with the second score putting the Rams ahead for good early in the fourth quarter. Todd Gurley had 16 carries for 120 yards and a touchdown to extend his team-record touchdown scoring streak to 13 straight games. Defensive tackle Aaron Donald earned 2.5 sacks, and newly-acquired linebacker Dante Fowler recorded a sack, forced fumble, and fumble recovery on the same play midway through the fourth quarter. One play later, wide receiver Brandin Cooks scored from nine yards out on a jet sweep for the Rams' final touchdown. Russell Wilson had three touchdown passes for the Seahawks, but threw four straight incompletions in the final minute as Los Angeles earned a season sweep of its NFC West rival and improved its record to 9-1. The victory was marred by the loss of Cooper Kupp, who suffered a torn ACL in the fourth quarter that would end his season.

The Rams would have back-to-back winning seasons for the first time since the 2000 and 2001 seasons.

Week 11: vs. Kansas City Chiefs

Originally scheduled to be played in Mexico City as part of the NFL International Series, the game was relocated to Los Angeles due to poor field conditions at Estadio Azteca, with the Rams having maintained availability of the Los Angeles Memorial Coliseum as a contingency. Additionally, the game took place in the aftermath of the Thousand Oaks shooting on November 7, in which 12 people were killed in a mass shooting, and the Woolsey Fire which broke out a day later and ravaged areas close to the Rams' administrative offices and practice facility, forcing the evacuation of both. Victims of both tragedies as well as police, firefighters, and first responders were honored prior to the game. Rams players and coaching staff, who had already departed to Colorado Springs, Colorado in preparation for the high-altitude conditions they expected to face in Mexico City, remained in place and conducted closed practices at the Air Force Academy. Both teams entered the game with 9-1 records, with their combined marks of 18-2 being the second-best in the history of Monday Night Football.

The matchup lived up to its billing, as the Rams and Chiefs combined for 105 points and 1,001 yards in total offense. Rams quarterback Jared Goff completed 31 of 49 passes for 413 yards and four touchdowns, the last coming on a 40-yard pass to tight end Gerald Everett with just under two minutes remaining. Linebacker Samson Ebukam scored on both fumble recovery and interception returns as the Rams forced five turnovers. For the Chiefs, quarterback Patrick Mahomes set career highs for attempts (46), completions (33), passing yards (478) and tied a personal best with six touchdowns, but threw three interceptions, also a career high. Rams wide receiver Brandin Cooks led his team with eight receptions for 107 yards, while Chiefs wideout Tyreek Hill had 10 catches for 215 yards and two TDs in the game, which featured six lead changes, including four in the fourth quarter. The 105 total points and the 14 combined touchdowns scored by both teams tied for the second-most in league history in both categories. Only a 2004 matchup between the Cincinnati Bengals and Cleveland Browns (106 points, 58-48) and a 1966 game with the Washington Redskins and New York Giants (113 points, 72-41) exceeded the Rams-Chiefs combined point total.

Week 13: at Detroit Lions

Todd Gurley ran for 132 yards on 23 carries and scored two touchdowns in the fourth quarter as the Rams pulled away from the host Lions to clinch their second straight NFC West Division title. Coming off their bye week, the Rams got off to a slow start and did not take a significant lead until late in the second quarter, when Greg Zuerlein kicked his second field goal, a 47-yarder, to give the Rams a 13-3 lead at halftime. In the third quarter, the Lions closed to within three points. Defensive tackle Aaron Donald had two sacks of Lions quarterback Matthew Stafford in the fourth quarter, stripping him of the ball on the second sack, with the fumble being recovered by linebacker Samson Ebukam. Three plays later, Gurley ran into the end zone for a 13-yard touchdown. Following Matt Prater's third field goal of the game to bring the Lions back to within a touchdown, Blake Countess recovered Detroit's onside kick attempt at the Lion 45. Facing a third-and-3 at the Lion 38 with 2:44 remaining in the game, Gurley broke loose for a 36-yard run, his longest of the season. With no one between him and the end zone, Gurley instead veered to his right and allowed himself to be tackled two yards short of the goal line. By not scoring, he forced Detroit to use its final time out before the two-minute warning. Two plays later, Gurley finally reached the end zone a second time to give the Rams a 30-16 lead. He was later named NFC Offensive Player of the Week for the second time this season. Cornerback Troy Hill intercepted a Stafford pass in the final seconds to seal the victory, which gave the Rams at least 11 victories for the second year in a row. Strong safety John Johnson again led the team with 11 tackles, while cornerback Aqib Talib saw his first action since September, starting the game and playing about one-third of the defensive snaps. On offense, Robert Woods had five receptions for 67 yards and a touchdown, while Brandin Cooks had four catches for 62 yards to give him 1,026 yards for the season. Cooks became the first receiver to ever record three consecutive 1,000-yard seasons with three different teams (having played for New Orleans in 2016 and New England in 2017).

Week 14: at Chicago Bears

Jared Goff threw a career-high four interceptions, and the Rams were held without a touchdown for the first time in the Sean McVay era in a loss to the host Bears on Sunday Night Football at Soldier Field. Los Angeles totaled only 214 offensive yards, less than half their season average, as the Bears controlled the clock 36:49 to 23:11. The Rams' only points came off two field goals by Greg Zuerlein in the first half. Wide receiver Robert Woods led the Rams with seven receptions for 61 yards to put him over 1,000 yards receiving for the first time in his career. Lamarcus Joyner led the team with seven tackles, while Marcus Peters, Nickell Robey-Coleman and John Johnson each had interceptions. With the loss, the Rams fell to 11-2.

Week 15: vs. Philadelphia Eagles

Despite being 13.5-point favorites entering this game, Sean McVay lost consecutive games for the first time as head coach as the Rams fell to the Eagles for the second straight season. Jared Goff passed for 339 yards and set career single-game highs in completions (35) and attempts (54), but had two interceptions, one of which led directly to a Philadelphia touchdown. The Eagles held the Rams without a first down and scored 17 unanswered points during a decisive third quarter in staking out a 30-13 lead. At the beginning of the fourth quarter, Philadelphia drove inside the Rams 20 and were poised to add to their lead when cornerback Aqib Talib picked off a Nick Foles pass and returned it 30 yards. That sparked a drive that ended with a 37-yard field goal by Greg Zuerlein. After forcing an Eagles punt, the Rams drove again with Goff connecting with wide receiver Josh Reynolds on a 33-yard pass to set up a first-and-goal at the Philadelphia 1. Two plays later, Todd Gurley (12 carries, 48 yards/10 receptions, 76 yards) scored his second touchdown of the game and 21st of the season. Following a missed field goal by the Eagles, the Rams mounted a drive in the final minute with no timeouts remaining. Goff drove the Rams down to the Eagles 18-yard-line, but a pass to Reynolds in the end zone fell incomplete as time expired, and L.A.'s record dropped to 11-3. Strong safety John Johnson had a team-high 14 tackles (11 solo), but the defense was held without a sack for only the second time in the season.

Week 16: at Arizona Cardinals

Signed to the Rams roster just five days earlier, running back C. J. Anderson was inserted into the starting lineup after Todd Gurley was declared inactive 90 minutes before gametime due to knee inflammation. The former Pro Bowler with the Denver Broncos proceeded to run 20 times for 167 yards to lead Los Angeles to a convincing fourth straight win over the host Cardinals. Anderson also scored on a 4-yard touchdown run late in the second quarter as the Rams built a 21-9 halftime lead. Jared Goff passed for 216 yards, including a 39-yard scoring pass to Robert Woods in the fourth quarter to seal the victory. Goff also scored on a 1-yard run early in the second quarter. Woods caught a team-high six passes for 89 yards, while also scoring the first rushing touchdown of his career on a 4-yard sweep in the first period. On defense, Aaron Donald had three sacks of Arizona quarterback Josh Rosen to increase his league-leading sack total to 19.5, and he was named NFC Defensive Player of the Week for the second time in the season and the fifth time in his career. Donald also set a new modern standard for defensive tackles, breaking the previous mark of 18.0 set in 1989 by Keith Millard of the Minnesota Vikings, while also surpassing former teammate Robert Quinn's modern-era club mark of 19.0 established during the 2013 St. Louis Rams season.

Week 17: vs. San Francisco 49ers

The Rams defense recorded four turnovers (including two interceptions by linebacker Cory Littleton) in the first half to help build a 31-10 halftime lead as Los Angeles secured a first round bye with the regular season-ending victory. Cornerback Aqib Talib picked up a fumble on the 49ers' opening possession, and Littleton intercepted a Nick Mullens pass on the next. Both turnovers were returned inside the 49er 20 to set up Rams touchdowns. Early in the second quarter, Littleton picked off his second pass of the day and returned it 19 yards for a score. The defense collected three sacks, with defensive tackle Aaron Donald getting one to end his season as the NFL's leader in quarterback sacks with 20.5, though he ultimately fell short of the NFL single season record of 22.5. Offensively, the Rams went turnover-free for the first time in six games, as quarterback Jared Goff threw for 199 yards and four touchdowns, two each to wide receivers Brandin Cooks and Josh Reynolds, while C. J. Anderson totaled 23 carries for 132 yards and a touchdown in relief of Todd Gurley, who sat out a second straight game. Greg Zuerlein added two field goals for the Rams, who swept the NFC West for the first time since their 1999 Super Bowl-winning season and equaled their win total from that year.

Standings

Division

Conference

Postseason

NFC Divisional Playoffs: vs. (4) Dallas Cowboys

On the second anniversary of his hiring as Los Angeles Rams head coach, Sean McVay won his first career playoff game as L.A. dominated both sides of the line of scrimmage to defeat Dallas and advance to the NFC Championship for the 10th time in franchise history. This was the ninth playoff meeting between the Rams and the Cowboys, more than any teams in NFL history, but the first time since 1985. C. J. Anderson ran for 123 yards on 23 carries with two touchdowns and Todd Gurley rushed 16 times for 115 yards and a score as the Rams totaled a whopping 273 yards on 48 rushing attempts. It was the 10th time in franchise history that two players had each rushed for over 100 yards in the same game, but the first time ever in a playoff game. The Rams began the game with a pair of long drives, both of which ended in Greg Zuerlein field goals. With the Cowboys leading 7-6 midway through the second quarter, L.A. went to work as both Anderson and Gurley ran effectively against a Dallas defense that was among the league's best against the run. Each scored a touchdown in the second period as L.A. took a 20-7 halftime lead. On defense, the Rams swarmed Cowboys running back Ezekiel Elliott, holding the NFL's rushing leader to just 47 yards on 20 carries. Clinging to a 23-15 lead at the beginning of the fourth quarter, the Rams defense stuffed Elliott for no gain on a 4th-and-1 play at the Ram 35. From there, Los Angeles went 65 yards in 12 plays before Anderson ended it with his second touchdown of the game. Dallas answered with a touchdown run by Dak Prescott just before the two-minute warning, and hoped to hold the Rams to a punt on the next possession. But on 3rd-and-7 at his own 28, Rams quarterback Jared Goff faked a handoff, rolled out to his right and ran 11 yards for the game-clinching first down. The Rams franchise won its first playoff game since a 27-20 victory over the Seattle Seahawks in the 2004 season, and it was the first time since the 1978 season that the Rams won a home playoff game at the Los Angeles Memorial Coliseum (a 34-10 win over the Minnesota Vikings), and their first home playoff victory at the Coliseum against the Cowboys after having lost in NFC Championship games there twice against Dallas to end the 1975 and 1978 seasons. John Johnson, Cory Littleton and Aqib Talib shared the team lead in tackles with seven each, and combined the Rams had six total tackles for loss, including a sack credited to Dante Fowler.

NFC Championship: at (1) New Orleans Saints

Kicker Greg Zuerlein converted four field goals, the last coming from 57 yards out with 11:47 remaining in overtime to lift the Rams over the host Saints for the NFC Championship and into the Super Bowl for the fourth time in franchise history. A matchup that featured the NFC's two most prolific offenses turned into a defensive battle, with both teams being held well below their season averages in total offense and points. New Orleans scored field goals on its first two drives (the second coming after an interception on a tipped ball) and Drew Brees ended the Saints' third drive of the quarter with a 5-yard TD pass to tight end Garrett Griffin to give New Orleans a 13-0 first quarter lead. The Rams' offense sputtered early, held to just 10 yards in nine plays and no first downs in the first period, but got a spark when Johnny Hekker tossed a 12-yard pass to Sam Shields on a fake punt that eventually led to a 36-yard field goal by Zuerlein with 9:49 left in the second quarter. With less than two minutes remaining in the second quarter and starting at their own 19, Rams quarterback Jared Goff completed four of six pass attempts, the last going 36 yards to wide receiver Brandin Cooks down to the New Orleans 6. From there, Gurley scored with 28 seconds left before halftime to bring the Rams within three points 13-10. After Brees threw his second touchdown pass to put the Saints up by 10 points, Goff completed six straight passes on an 11-play, 75-yard drive, the last a 1-yard scoring strike to tight end Tyler Higbee. Midway through the fourth quarter, the Rams mounted their strongest drive of the game, driving from their own 9 to the Saints 1-yard line before settling for a 24-yard field goal from Zuerlein with 5:06 remaining to tie the game at 20-20. Brees and the Saints rallied to push deep into Rams territory, but the drive stalled at the Rams 13-yard-line, where Wil Lutz kicked his third field goal of the game with 1:45 remaining. During the drive, Rams cornerback Nickell Robey-Coleman committed a pass interference that went uncalled; had it been called, the Saints would have been in a better position to seal the game with a touchdown. Goff then drove the Rams to the New Orleans 30 to set up Zuerlein's successful 48-yard field goal with 19 seconds remaining to send the game into overtime. The Saints won the toss and elected to receive, but Brees was forced into three incompletions, and on his third attempt, as he threw, he was hit by Rams linebacker Dante Fowler and the wobbly pass was intercepted by Rams strong safety John Johnson. Goff completed two key passes to Higbee while under heavy pressure to reach the New Orleans 39. From there, Hekker handled a low snap and Zuerlein's kick sailed through the uprights to stun the home crowd at the Mercedes-Benz Superdome. It was the longest game-winning kick in NFL playoff history. Goff completed 25 of 40 passes for 297 yards with a touchdown and an interception, while Cooks led the Rams with seven receptions for 107 yards against the team that had originally drafted him. Josh Reynolds added four receptions for 74 yards and ran 16 yards to set up a Rams touchdown. C. J. Anderson ran 16 times for 44 yards to lead Los Angeles on the ground, while Gurley played sparingly and finished with only 10 yards rushing (13 yards total offense) and a touchdown. On defense, Cory Littleton had 12 tackles (11 solo) and Ndamukong Suh had four tackles, including 1.5 sacks to lead L.A.

Super Bowl LIII: vs. (A2) New England Patriots

Playing in a hard-fought defensive struggle that resulted in the lowest-scoring Super Bowl in league history, the Rams were unable to prevent the Patriots from claiming their sixth NFL championship. On the opening possession, Cory Littleton intercepted a deflected pass from Tom Brady, but the Rams' offense was unable to get into rhythm as they punted eight straight times. Neither team was able to reach the red zone through the first three-quarters, with Stephen Gostkowski putting New England into the lead with a 42-yard field goal with just over three minutes before halftime. Greg Zuerlein evened the score with a 53-yard field goal with 2:11 left in the third quarter. The Patriots did not break through until seven minutes remained in the fourth quarter when running back Sony Michel scored on a 2-yard run (it was the only time that either team penetrated the red zone in the game). The Rams responded with one of their most effective drives, reaching the New England 27. From there, Rams quarterback Jared Goff tried to connect with wide receiver Brandin Cooks, who was unable to gather in the end zone pass under heavy coverage by Patriots cornerback Stephon Gilmore. Goff went back to Cooks on the next play, but this time Gilmore was there to make the interception at the New England 4. The Patriots then sealed the game, driving 72 yards in nine plays before Gostkowski added his second field goal of this game, this one from 41 yards out with 1:12 remaining. Los Angeles drove to the New England 30 on its final possession, but with four seconds left, Zuerlein missed on a 48-yard field goal attempt. Goff completed 19 of 38 passes for 229 yards, including an interception while being sacked four times. New England's defense disrupted L.A.'s offensive line, as neither Todd Gurley (10 carries, 35 yards) nor C. J. Anderson were effective against the Patriots. Brandin Cooks led the Rams with eight receptions for 120 yards, as Los Angeles tied with the 1971 Miami Dolphins for the fewest points scored by a single team in Super Bowl history. Defensively, Littleton led the Rams with six tackles and an interception. Midway through the third quarter, Rams punter Johnny Hekker booted a 65-yard punt, the longest punt in Super Bowl history.

Awards and honors

References

External links
 

Los Angeles
Los Angeles Rams seasons
Los Angeles Rams
Rams
NFC West championship seasons
National Football Conference championship seasons